The Homestead Extension of Florida's Turnpike (HEFT), designated as unsigned State Road 821 (SR 821), is the southern extension of Florida's Turnpike, a toll road in the U.S. state of Florida maintained by Florida's Turnpike Enterprise (FTE). Spanning approximately  along a north–south axis, it supplements the  mainline (designated as SR 91) to form the complete  turnpike. The extension begins at its southern terminus at U.S. Route 1 (US 1) in Florida City, and transitions into the SR 91 mainline in Miramar at its northern end. Despite their designations as different state roads, the mainline and the extension are continuous in their exit numbering.

It was opened in stages between 1973 and 1974, after the mainline of the Turnpike was completed, and is used by both commuters and travelers to the Florida Keys and Everglades National Park. Due to its alignment, it acts as a de facto outer beltway for Miami, with the Palmetto Expressway (State Road 826) forming an inner beltway.

Route description
The road begins at its south end at a partial interchange with US 1 in Florida City next to the Florida Keys Outlet Center, where the road heads northeast as a four lane expressway. Travelers to here from the northern parts of the Turnpike Extension can continue south along US 1 to the Florida Keys or the Everglades National Park (via SR 9336). This point also marks the beginning of the HEFT's hidden designation of State Road 821.

Between Florida City and Cutler Bay, the HEFT acts as an alternative highway for the communities along US 1. The first 16 miles of the tollway are located within mostly new residential developments that were constructed after Hurricane Andrew, which destroyed most of the area in 1992. Some farms line the rest of this stretch. The first interchange northbound is Campbell Drive / Southwest 312th Street in Homestead, which allows travelers to access the Homestead Hospital and the Homestead-Miami Speedway. The Turnpike then has an exit with Southwest 288th Street at mile 5, providing a connection to the Homestead Air Reserve Base, before leaving Homestead and entering parts of unincorporated Miami-Dade County. At mile 6, the tollway has a southbound exit and northbound entry for Southwest 137th Avenue, with the HEFT heading east-northeast until the exit with SR 989 (Allapattah Road / Southwest 112th Avenue) at mile 9. The road then curves to a northerly direction towards the Homestead Toll Gantry, the first of four on the route, at mile 10. It then enters Cutler Bay, where the highway is also known as the John F. Cosgrove Highway for the next five miles. The first exit in Cutler Bay is with Southwest 216th Street/Cutler Ridge Blvd at mile 11, followed by another at Caribbean Blvd at mile 12. Following exit 11, the turnpike widens to six lanes. The tollway then crosses back over US 1 at the Southland Mall and leaves Cutler Bay. Continuing north, the HEFT serves SR 994 (Quail Roost Drive) at exit 13 and gains another lane in each direction. This is followed by SR 992 (Coral Reef Drive (Southwest 152nd Street)) at exit 16, which marks the northern terminus of the John F. Cosgrove Highway.

The tollway passes through older, predominantly residential areas for the next ten miles. Between exits 16 and 17, the Turnpike Extension swells to ten lanes; this section of the tollway also has the highest traffic count at 172,000 vehicles per day (as of 2014). Past exit 17, where SR 874 (Don Shula Expressway) leaves the HEFT to connect to SR 826 (Palmetto Expressway), the tollway drops back to six lanes and soon reaches an interchange with Southwest 120th Street at mile 19. Just north of the Southwest 120th Street exit, still at mile 19, lies the Snapper Creek Service plaza, which is located on the center median with access from both directions and is the only plaza on the extension; unlike the more robust services along the mainline, it only offers a convenience store inside the gas station. The next exit is with SR 94 (Kendall Drive), followed by the Bird Road Toll Gantry at mile 23; from here, the HEFT takes a beeline path north for the next ten miles. The next exit is with SR 976 (Southwest 40th Street), after which the HEFT gains two extra lanes in preparation for the next two exits. After the tollway forms the western end of the Florida International University campus, it meets the Tamiami Trail (US 41) at exit 25, and then SR 836 (Dolphin Expressway) at exit 26 in Fontainebleau, which provides access to Miami International Airport eastbound.

North of this interchange, the Turnpike Extension enters a stretch where it forms the border between undeveloped Miami-Dade County to the west and residential developments to the east for the rest of its journey in the county, its width varying between six and eight lanes, with exits at Northwest 12th Street at mile 26, Northwest 41st Street at mile 29, and at Northwest 74th Street at mile 31. Half a mile north of Northwest 74th Street lies the Okeechobee Toll gantry, with the HEFT then intersecting Northwest 106th Street/Beacon Station Boulevard at mile 34. The tollway starts to curve in a north-easterly direction and comes to exit 35 with US 27. Afterwards, the expressway fully enters an undeveloped portion of Miami-Dade County until the next exit at I-75 northbound at exit 39, which is a northbound only exit, with the southbound direction of the Turnpike Extension receiving some traffic from I-75 south. North of the I-75 interchange, the HEFT becomes a four-laned highway again. It crosses the Broward County line, entering the suburban community of Miramar, and then curves eastward. The expressway has an interchange with SR 823 (Red Road) at exit 43, after which the Turnpike Extension is just one block north of the Miami-Dade County line for the remainder of the tollway's length. Residential and commercial developments line both sides of the HEFT through here. The next exit is with SR 817 (University Drive) at exit 46, allowing access to Hard Rock Stadium and the Calder Race Course. The Miramar Toll gantry then follows the interchange before the Turnpike Extension ends four miles north of the Golden Glades Interchange at the mainline of Florida's Turnpike.

Tolls
The HEFT is an all-electronic toll road. Tolls are only accepted via SunPass transponders or by toll-by-plate billing at a higher cost. Cash is not accepted. The toll gantries are located at the former toll plazas, which closed on February 19, 2011. As of July 1, 2015, the total cost for a two-axled vehicle to drive the whole length of the Turnpike Extension is $4.24 with SunPass and $5.28 via the toll-by-plate system. The HEFT has a toll gantry approximately every . In addition to the mainline toll gantries, most interchanges have individual toll gantries for entering or exiting vehicles; typically, these can be found either on the northbound entry and southbound exit, or the southbound entry and northern exit. Most of these gantries charge $0.53 via SunPass or $0.79 via toll-by-plate per entry or exit, but the Allapattah Road, Northwest 74th Street and Northwest 27th Avenue interchanges charge $0.79 via SunPass or $1.06 via toll-by-plate.

Services
The Snapper Creek service plaza is the lone service plaza on the HEFT, located at mile 19 in the median of the expressway. It is accessible from both directions. The service plaza is open 24 hours a day, featuring a gas station and a convenience store.

History
After the Turnpike mainline was completed in 1964, the Turnpike Authority (precursor to Florida's Turnpike Enterprise) explored several extensions to the Turnpike system, including an expressway in western Dade County from Florida City to the Turnpike mainline at the Dade/Broward county line. Construction on the tollway began in July 1971. The northernmost thirteen miles of the tollway between US 27 and the Turnpike mainline was open to traffic on May 1, 1973, at a cost of $22 million and a $0.40 toll to motorists. During the first half of 1974, the expressway between Campbell Drive (SW 312th Street) and US 27 was opened in five stages, with the road running uninterrupted from the Turnpike in Miramar to Homestead on May 20, 1974, with the last section to Florida City connecting to US 1 completed later in 1974. The total toll of the expressway was $0.80.

The HEFT has used mile-based exit numbers and an open toll collection system since its opening; both concepts that were implemented on the Turnpike mainline in the late 1980s and early 1990s.

On April 27, 1986, the Okeechobee toll plaza opened with a $.25 toll, with the toll plaza at the US 27 exit being removed, and tolls at the Miramar plaza being lowered from $.40 to $.25. On February 2, 1989, tolls on the Expressway doubled from $1.00 to $2.00, with $.50 being charged at each toll plaza. Toll hikes, raising the cost of travelling the expressway from $2 to $3 were supposed to take effect on the Homestead Extension in 1993 to match the rest of the Turnpike, but Hurricane Andrew's impact in the area in 1992 had the state delay toll hikes on the highway until July 9, 1995. In 1997, the Bird Road toll plaza was reconfigured to its current two part form to accommodate the then-bottleneck section of the expressway. The SunPass electronic toll collection system was implemented during 1999, with the toll plazas being reconfigured to allow lanes dedicated to transponder users. A toll hike took effect on March 7, 2004, increasing the toll rate for non SunPass users to $4 for a full length trip, with SunPass users still using the 1995 toll rates.

The portion of the HEFT between Exits 11 (Cutler Ridge Boulevard) and 16 (State Road 992) was designated the "John F. Cosgrove Highway" in 2008 by the Florida Legislature, following his death in 2006. A lawyer and former legislator, Cosgrove was also the first mayor of Cutler Bay, a city along the HEFT. He was instrumental in passing legislation to keep insurers from leaving the state following Hurricane Andrew.

On February 19, 2011, the HEFT ceased cash toll collections, becoming an exclusively electronic toll road, a move that was announced in November 2009. The staffed toll plazas were converted into all electronic toll gantries, and the only ways to pay are either by SunPass transponders or billing by the toll-by-plate program.

In 2007, legislation was passed in Florida to index toll rates across the state to the national Consumer price index (CPI), to be enacted by the end of June, 2012. As a result, the toll rates on the HEFT were raised on June 24, 2012, an increase of 11.7% to reflect the previous five years. In keeping with the legislation, SunPass and toll-by-plate rates were then raised again on July 1, 2013 by 2.1%. Since the indexing of tolls to the national CPI, the entry and exit toll rates have risen by approximately 30 cents, in some cases more than double their pre-2012 rates.

Exit list
Despite being designated by the Florida Department of Transportation as a separate route (SR 821) from the main portion of Florida's Turnpike (SR 91), the HEFT's exit numbers are regarded to be a continuation of the Turnpike's mainline.

See also

 Florida's Turnpike
 John F. Cosgrove

References

External links

Homestead Extension Description at Florida's Turnpike Authority 
Homestead Extension North in Florida at SouthEastRoads
Homestead Extension South in Florida at SouthEastRoads

Turnpike
Turnpike
Turnpike
Homestead, Florida
1973 establishments in Florida